Daniel Bispo dos Santos  (born June 16, 1974 in São Paulo) is a boxer from Brazil. He represented his native country at the 1996 Summer Olympics in Atlanta, United States.

Pro
He made his professional debut in 1997. On March 12, 2005, he was defeated in the fight for the World Boxing Council International cruiserweight title by Italy's Giacobbe Fragomeni in the Mazda Palace in Milan.

Professional boxing record

|-
|align="center" colspan=8|22 Wins (16 knockouts, 6 decisions), 16 Losses (7 knockouts, 9 decisions) 
|-
| align="center" style="border-style: none none solid solid; background: #e3e3e3"|Result
| align="center" style="border-style: none none solid solid; background: #e3e3e3"|Record
| align="center" style="border-style: none none solid solid; background: #e3e3e3"|Opponent
| align="center" style="border-style: none none solid solid; background: #e3e3e3"|Type
| align="center" style="border-style: none none solid solid; background: #e3e3e3"|Round
| align="center" style="border-style: none none solid solid; background: #e3e3e3"|Date
| align="center" style="border-style: none none solid solid; background: #e3e3e3"|Location
| align="center" style="border-style: none none solid solid; background: #e3e3e3"|Notes
|-align=center
|Loss
|
|align=left| Richard Towers
|TKO
|2
|26 Feb 2011
|align=left| Bolton, England
|align=left|
|-
|Loss
|
|align=left| Gonzalo Basile
|UD
|6
|4 Sep 2010
|align=left| Mar del Plata, Argentina
|align=left|
|-
|Loss
|
|align=left| Gonzalo Basile
|UD
|10
|23 Jul 2010
|align=left| Lomas de Zamora, Argentina
|align=left|
|-
|Loss
|
|align=left| David Rodriguez
|TKO
|2
|27 Mar 2010
|align=left| Monterrey, Mexico
|align=left|
|-
|Win
|
|align=left| Fidel Jorge Mando
|RTD
|1
|26 Feb 2010
|align=left| São Paulo, Brazil
|align=left|
|-
|Loss
|
|align=left| Troy Ross
|KO
|1
|5 Dec 2009
|align=left| Montreal, Quebec, Canada
|align=left|
|-
|Win
|
|align=left| Jose Raimundo
|TKO
|1
|24 Mar 2009
|align=left| São Paulo, Brazil
|align=left|
|-
|Loss
|
|align=left| Alexander Ustinov
|KO
|2
|22 Aug 2008
|align=left| Beijing, China
|align=left|
|-
|Loss
|
|align=left| Carlos Takam
|TKO
|3
|5 Jun 2008
|align=left| Paris, France
|align=left|
|-
|Loss
|
|align=left| Ali Ismailov
|UD
|8
|3 Apr 2008
|align=left| Saint Petersburg, Russia
|align=left|
|-
|Win
|
|align=left| Dacio Pereira da Silva
|TKO
|4
|27 Oct 2007
|align=left| São Paulo, Brazil
|align=left|
|-
|Loss
|
|align=left| Yoan Pablo Hernandez
|KO
|1
|18 Aug 2007
|align=left| Prenzlauer Berg, Berlin, Germany
|align=left|
|-
|Loss
|
|align=left| Corrie Sanders
|UD
|10
|12 May 2007
|align=left| Kempton Park, South Africa
|align=left|
|-
|Win
|
|align=left| Paulo Dos Santos Aragao
|KO
|2
|5 Apr 2007
|align=left| São Paulo, Brazil
|align=left|
|-
|Loss
|
|align=left| Roman Kracik
|UD
|10
|1 Dec 2006
|align=left| Prague, Czech Republic
|align=left|
|-
|Loss
|
|align=left| Vincenzo Cantatore
|UD
|10
|21 Oct 2006
|align=left| Rome, Lazio, Italy
|align=left|
|-
|Win
|
|align=left| Wesley Barbosa
|KO
|3
|16 Sep 2006
|align=left| São Paulo, Brazil
|align=left|
|-
|Loss
|
|align=left| Kevin Johnson
|UD
|10
|10 Jun 2006
|align=left| Atlantic City, New Jersey, U.S.
|align=left|
|-
|Win
|
|align=left| Ramiro Borges
|KO
|2
|6 May 2006
|align=left| São Paulo, Brazil
|align=left|
|-
|Loss
|
|align=left| Fres Oquendo
|TKO
|9
|16 Feb 2006
|align=left| New York City, U.S.
|align=left|
|-
|Win
|
|align=left| Dacio Pereira da Silva
|KO
|2
|30 Sep 2005
|align=left| São Paulo, Brazil
|align=left|
|-
|Loss
|
|align=left| Claudio Rasco
|UD
|6
|9 Apr 2005
|align=left| Montreal, Quebec, Canada
|align=left|
|-
|Loss
|
|align=left| Giacobbe Fragomeni
|UD
|12
|12 Mar 2005
|align=left| Milan, Lombardia, Italy
|align=left|
|-
|Win
|
|align=left| Jonathan Young
|UD
|6
|5 Nov 2004
|align=left| Las Vegas, Nevada, U.S.
|align=left|
|-
|Win
|
|align=left| Josemir De Oliveira
|KO
|4
|7 Aug 2004
|align=left| São Paulo, Brazil
|align=left|
|-
|Win
|
|align=left| Rogério Lobo
|UD
|10
|24 Jan 2004
|align=left| São Paulo, Brazil
|align=left|
|-
|Win
|
|align=left| Richard Da Gloria
|TKO
|5
|15 Nov 2003
|align=left| São Paulo, Brazil
|align=left|
|-
|Win
|
|align=left| Luis Americo Kihara
|TKO
|3
|25 Jul 2003
|align=left| Araras, Brazil
|align=left|
|-
|Win
|
|align=left| Luis Uizcarra
|KO
|2
|18 May 2002
|align=left| Araras, Brazil
|align=left|
|-
|Win
|
|align=left| Reinaldo Fidelis
|UD
|6
|20 Apr 2002
|align=left| Avaré, Brazil
|align=left|
|-
|Win
|
|align=left| Richard Da Gloria
|UD
|4
|23 Dec 2001
|align=left| Carapicuiba, Brazil
|align=left|
|-
|Win
|
|align=left| Marival Sobral Sobrinho
|TKO
|1
|21 Oct 2001
|align=left| Curitiba, Brazil
|align=left|
|-
|Win
|
|align=left| Lourival Luiz Da Silva
|UD
|6
|20 Jul 2001
|align=left| São Paulo, Brazil
|align=left|
|-
|Win
|
|align=left| Silvio Silva Nascimento
|KO
|2
|8 Jun 2001
|align=left| Ferraz de Vasconcelos, Brazil
|align=left|
|-
|Win
|
|align=left| Aloisio Vieira
|KO
|2
|5 May 2001
|align=left| Cabreuva, Brazil
|align=left|
|-
|Win
|
|align=left| Josevaldo Alves de Oliveira
|TKO
|4
|10 Jun 2000
|align=left| Araras, Brazil
|align=left|
|-
|Win
|
|align=left| Ricardo Lobo
|TKO
|2
|13 May 2000
|align=left| Juquia, Brazil
|align=left|
|-
|Win
|
|align=left| Gerson Uletra
|UD
|6
|12 Apr 1997
|align=left| Aguas de Lindoia, Brazil
|align=left|
|}

External links
 

1974 births
Living people
Heavyweight boxers
Boxers at the 1996 Summer Olympics
Olympic boxers of Brazil
Brazilian male boxers
Sportspeople from São Paulo